The Diamniadio Olympic Stadium, also known as the Stade Me. Abdoulaye Wade, is a multi-purpose stadium, which can host football, rugby and athletics, in Diamniadio, in Dakar, Senegal. It is the national stadium of the Senegal national football team. The stadium which has a capacity of 50,000 designed by Tabanlıoğlu Architects and built by Summa.
It will host the 2026 Summer Youth Olympics.

Design

Design 
The stadium was designed by the Turkish architectural office Tabanlıoğlu Architects.

Construction 
The stadium was built in 18 months by the Turkish construction company Summa. The contract type was a design–build turnkey project.

Cost  
The cost of the construction was reported to be 156 billion CFA francs ($270 million).

History

Inaugural match 
The stadium was officially inaugurated by Senegalese President Macky Sall, in the presence of Turkish President Recep Tayyip Erdogan, FIFA President Gianni Infantino, Guinea-Bissau President Umaro Sissoco Embaló, Rwandan President Paul Kagame, Liberian President George Weah and Gambian President Adama Barrow.

The first match was a game between a selection from various generations of the Senegal national football team against a selection of African football legends. The Senegalese team composed of player such as El Hadj Diouf, Boubacar Sarr, Demba Ba, Mamadou Niang, Moussa Sow, Lamine Diatta, Omar Daf, Khalilou Fadiga, Oumar Sène, Thierno Youm, Racine Kane and Souleymane Sané. 
The other team consisted of players such as Samuel Eto'o, Didier Drogba, Yaya Touré, Emmanuel Adebayor, Jay-Jay Okocha, Asamoah Gyan, Patrick Mboma, Moustapha Hadji, Samuel Kuffour, Shabani Nonda and Jonathan Pitroipa. The match ended in a 1–1 draw.

The rest of the ceremony was marked by cultural and musical performances by stars of Senegalese music, Ismaël Lô, Baaba Maal and Youssou N'Dour.

References

Athletics (track and field) venues in Senegal
Football venues in Senegal
National stadiums
Sport in Dakar
Multi-purpose stadiums
Buildings and structures in Dakar
Sports venues completed in 2022
2022 establishments in Senegal